Middle English phonology is necessarily somewhat speculative, since it is preserved only as a written language. Nevertheless, there is a very large text corpus of Middle English. The dialects of Middle English vary greatly over both time and place, and in contrast with Old English and Modern English, spelling was usually phonetic rather than conventional. Words were generally spelled according to how they sounded to the person writing a text, rather than according to a formalised system that might not accurately represent the way the writer's dialect was pronounced, as Modern English is today.

The Middle English speech of the city of London in the late 14th century (essentially, the speech of Geoffrey Chaucer) is used as the standard Middle English dialect in teaching and when specifying "the" grammar or phonology of Middle English.  It is this form that is described below, unless otherwise indicated.

In the rest of the article, abbreviations are used as follows:

Sound inventory
The surface sounds of Chaucerian Middle English (whether allophones or phonemes) are shown in the tables below.

Consonants

 1.  The exact nature of Middle English r is unknown. It may have been an alveolar approximant , as in most Modern English accents, an alveolar tap  or an alveolar trill . This article uses  indiscriminately.

Consonant allophones
The sounds marked in parentheses in the table above are allophones:
 is an allophone of  occurring before  and 
The evidence for the allophone  after front vowels is indirect, as it is not indicated in the orthography. Moreover, in late Middle English (post-Chaucer),  sometimes became  (tough, cough) but only after back vowels, never after front vowels. That is explained if the allophone  is assumed to have sometimes become  but that the allophone  never did. (See H-loss, below.)

Voiced fricatives
That led to many alternations: hūs ('house')  vs. hūses ('of a house') ; wīf ('woman')  vs. wīfes ('of a woman') . In Middle English, voiced allophones become phonemes, and they are solidly established in Modern English as separate phonemes by several sources:
Borrowings from foreign languages, especially Latin, Ancient Greek, and Old French, which introduced sounds where they had not occurred: modern fine vs. vine (both borrowings from French); ether (from Greek) vs. either (native).
Dialect mixture between Old English dialects (like Kentish) that voiced initial fricatives and the more standard dialects that did not. Compare fat vs. vat (both with f- in standard Old English) and fox vs. vixen (Old English fox vs. fyxen, from Proto-Germanic  vs. ).
Loss of final , resulting in voiced fricatives at the end of a word where only voiceless fricatives had occurred. That is the source of the modern distinctions house vs. to house, teeth vs. to teethe, half vs. to halve.
Reduction of double consonants to single consonants.
A Sandhi effect that introduced the voiced fricative /ð/ instead of original /θ/ at the beginning of unstressed function words. Contrast  this with initial  vs. thistle with initial .
A sound change that caused  fricatives to be voiced when preceded by a fully unstressed syllable. This change is reflected in the modern pronunciation of the endings spelt -s (the noun plural ending, the 'Saxon genitive' ending and the ending for 3rd person present indicative), which now have phonemic shape -, having developed in Middle English from - to - and then, after the deletion of the unstressed vowel, to - (e.g. halls, tells with from earlier halles, telles). The sound change also affects function words ending in original - that are normally unstressed.
The status of the sources in Chaucer's Middle English is as follows:
The first three sources (borrowing, dialect mixture, analogy) were already established.
As indicated by versification, the loss of final  was normal in Chaucer's time before a vowel-initial word and optional elsewhere; it is assumed that it is a poetic relic and that the loss of final  was already complete in spoken English (a similar situation to Modern French; see e muet).
The reduction of double consonants was apparently about to occur.
The sandhi effects on unstressed function words occurred somewhat later, in the transition to Modern English.

Vowels

Monophthongs

Middle English had a distinction between close-mid and open-mid long vowels but no corresponding distinction in short vowels. Although the behavior of open syllable lengthening seems to indicate that the short vowels were open-mid in quality, according to Lass, they were close-mid. Later, the short vowels were in fact lowered to become open-mid vowels, as is shown by their values in Modern English.

The front rounded vowels  existed in the southwest dialects of Middle English, which developed from the standard Late West Saxon dialect of Old English, but not in the standard Middle English dialect of London.

The mid-front rounded vowels  likewise had existed in the southwest dialects but not in the standard Middle English dialect of London. Sometime in the 13th century, they became unrounded and merged with the normal front mid vowels. There is no direct evidence that there was ever a distinction between open-mid  and close-mid , but it can be assumed because of the corresponding distinction in the unrounded mid front vowels.  would have derived directly from Old English , and  derived from the open syllable lengthening of short , from the Old English short diphthong .

The quality of the short open vowel is unclear.

Diphthongs

1The Old English sequences ,  produced late Middle English , apparently after passing through early Middle English : OE grōwan ('grow') > LME . However, early Middle English  produced by Middle English breaking became late Middle English : OE tōh (tough') > EME  > LME .

All of the above diphthongs came about within the Middle English era.  Old English had a number of diphthongs, but all of them had been reduced to monophthongs in the transition to Middle English. Middle English diphthongs came about by various processes and at various time periods. Diphthongs tended to change their quality over time. The changes above occurred mostly between early and late Middle English. Early Middle English had a distinction between open-mid and close-mid diphthongs, and all of the close-mid diphthongs had been eliminated by late Middle English.

The following processes produced the above diphthongs:
OE weġ ('way') > EME  > LME 
OE dæġ ('day') > ME 
Middle English breaking before 
Borrowing, especially from Old French

Phonological processes

The following sections describe the major phonological processes occurring between written Late West Saxon (the standard written form of Old English) and the end of Middle English, conventionally dated to around 1500 AD.

Homorganic lengthening
Later on, the vowels in many of these words were shortened again, giving the appearance that no lengthening happened; but evidence from the Ormulum indicates otherwise. For details see Phonological history of Old English: Vowel lengthening.

Stressed vowel changes

In the transition to Middle English, this system underwent major changes, eliminating the diphthongs and leaving only one pair of low vowels, but with a vowel distinction appearing in the long mid vowels:
Subsequently, the low vowels were modified as follows:
 and  merged to a single central vowel .
In the southwest, the front-rounded vowels  and  remained, and were spelled .

This left an asymmetric system consisting of five short vowels  and six long vowels  , with additional front-rounded vowels  in the southwest area.  Some symmetry was restored by open syllable lengthening, which restored a long low vowel .

Reduction and loss of unstressed vowels
Unstressed vowels were gradually confused in late Old English, although the spelling lagged behind, due to the existence of a standardized spelling system.  By early Middle English, all unstressed vowels were spelt , probably representing .  Also in late Old English, final unstressed  became ; during the Middle English period, this final  was dropped when it was part of an inflectional syllable (but remained when part of the root, e.g. seven, or in derivational endings, e.g. written).  Around Chaucer's time, final  was dropped; judging from inflectional evidence, this occurred first when the following word began with a vowel.  A century or so later, unstressed  also dropped in the plural and genitive ending -es (spelled -s in Modern English) and the past ending -ed.

These changes steadily effaced most inflectional endings, e.g.:
OE  > ME  > LME  > NE meet 
OE  > ME  > LME  > NE week 
OE  > ME  > LME  > NE name 
In the last two examples, the stressed vowel was affected by open-syllable lengthening.

This occurred around the year 1200.

Breaking

During the 12th or 13th century, a vowel  was inserted between a front vowel and a following  (pronounced  in this context), and a vowel  was inserted between a back vowel and a following  (pronounced  in this context).  Short  was treated as a back vowel in this process (the long equivalent did not occur in the relevant context). See H-loss, below.

Open-syllable lengthening

Around the 13th century, short vowels were lengthened in an open syllable (i.e. when followed by a single consonant that in turn is followed by another vowel).  In addition, non-low vowels were lowered:  > ,  > ,  > ,  > .  This accounts, for example, for the vowel difference between staff and the alternative plural staves (Middle English staf vs. stāves, with open-syllable lengthening in the latter word).  This process was restricted in the following ways:
It did not occur when two or more syllables followed, due to the opposing process of trisyllabic laxing.
OE wudu > ME  > wood; OE wicu > ME  > week. OE hnutu > NE nut, OE riden > NE ridden.

The effects of open-syllable lengthening and trisyllabic laxing often led to differences in the stem vowel between singular and plural/genitive.  Generally these differences were regularized by analogy in one direction or another, but not in a consistent way:
ME  > NE path, paths, but ME  > NE whale, whales
ME  > NE cradle, cradles, but ME  > NE saddle, saddles

Trisyllabic laxing

In late Old English, vowels were shortened before clusters of two consonants when two or more syllables followed.  Later in Middle English this process was expanded, and applied to all vowels when two or more syllables followed.  This led to the Modern English variations between divine vs. divinity, school vs. scholarly, grateful vs. gratitude, etc.  In some cases, later changes have led to apparently anomalous results, e.g. south vs. southern with only two syllables (but  at the time that trisyllabic laxing applied).  This change is still fairly productive in Modern English.

Pre-cluster shortening
In late Old English, vowels were shortened before clusters of three consonants:
OE gāst > NE ghost ; OE gāstliċ > NE ghastly 
OE ċild > NE child ; OE ċildru + OE -an > NE children 
OE gōd > NE good; OE gōdspell > NE gospel

As shown by ghastly, this shortening occurred before the raising of OE  to EME , which occurred in the transition to Middle English.

Later in Middle English, vowels were shortened before clusters of two consonants, except before  and in some cases where homorganic lengthening applied.  Examples:
OE cēpte > kept (cf. OE cēpan > keep)
OE mētte > met (cf. OE mētan > meet)

Reduction of double consonants
Double (geminated) consonants were reduced to single ones. This took place after open syllable lengthening; the syllable before a geminate was a closed syllable, hence vowels were not lengthened before (originally) doubled consonants. The loss of gemination may have been stimulated by its small functional load—by this time there were few minimal pairs of words distinguished solely by the single vs. double consonant contrast.

H-loss
The phoneme , when it occurred in the syllable coda, is believed to have had two allophones: the voiceless palatal fricative , occurring after front vowels, and the voiceless velar fricative , occurring after back vowels.

These sounds were lost during the later Middle English and Early Modern English eras. The timing of this process was dependent on dialect; the fricatives were still pronounced in some educated speech in the 16th century, but they had disappeared by the late 17th. Loss of the fricatives was accompanied by some compensatory lengthening or diphthongization of preceding vowels. However, the palatal fricative  in no instances became .

Some possible developments are illustrated below:
OE niht ('night') > ME   >  > NE  (by the Great Vowel Shift)
OE hlæhhan ('to laugh') > ME  > LLME  > ENE  > NE 
OE tōh ('tough') > ME  > LLME  > NE 

 spelled -gh- is realized as  even today in some traditional dialects of northern England and more famously Scots.

The modern phoneme  most commonly appears today in the typically Scottish word loch and in names such as Buchan. The same is true in Wales, in names such as Loughor.

Great Vowel Shift

The Great Vowel Shift was a fundamental change in late Middle English (post-Chaucer) and Early Modern English that affected the pronunciation of all of the long vowels.

Diphthong loss
Although not normally considered a part of the Great Vowel Shift, during the same time period most of the pre-existing Middle English diphthongs were monophthongized:
 > ENE  >  > NE 
 > ENE 
 > ENE  > NE 

The remaining diphthongs developed as follows:
,  > ENE  > NE .   is still used in Welsh English.
,  > NE

Vowel equivalents from Old English to Modern English 
For a detailed description of the changes between Old English and Middle/Modern English, see the article on the phonological history of English. A summary of the main vowel changes is presented below. The spelling of Modern English largely reflects Middle English pronunciation.

Monophthongs
This table presents the general developments. Vowels were diphthongized in Middle English before , and new diphthongs arose in Middle English by the combination of vowels with Old English w, g  > , and ġ ; for more information, see the section below. The only conditional development considered in detail below is Middle English open-syllable lengthening. In the column on modern spelling, CV means a sequence of a single consonant followed by a vowel.

The Modern English vowel usually spelled au (British , American ) does not appear in the above chart.

As mentioned above, Modern English is derived from the Middle English of London, which is derived largely from Anglian Old English, with some admixture of West Saxon and Kentish. One of the most noticeable differences among the dialects is the handling of original Old English . In the West Saxon area,  remained as such well into Middle English times and was written u in Middle English documents from the area. Some words with the sound were borrowed into London Middle English, where the unfamiliar  was substituted with :
gild < gyldan, did < dyde, sin < synn, mind < mynd, dizzy < dysiġ, lift < lyft etc. show the normal (Anglian) development;
much < myċel shows the West Saxon development;
merry < myriġ shows the Kentish development;
bury  < byrġan has its spelling from West Saxon but its pronunciation from Kentish;
busy  < bysiġ, build < byldan, buy < bycġan have their spelling from West Saxon but their pronunciation from Anglian.

Some apparent instances of modern e for Old English y are actually regular developments, particularly if the y is a development of earlier (West Saxon) ie from i-mutation of ea, as the normal i-mutation of ea in Anglian is e; for example, stern <  < , steel < stȳle <  (cf. Old Saxon stehli). Also, some apparent instances of modern u for Old English y may actually be from the influence of a related form with unmutated u: sundry < syndriġ, influenced by sundor "apart, differently" (compare to sunder and asunder).

Diphthongs

References

Sources
 

English phonology
Phonology